EcoRodovias is a Brazilian transportation company mainly focused on highway concessions and associated services. It is one of the largest transportation  Company in Latin America.

History 
In December 2015, Gruppo Gavio bought 41% of EcoRodovias from the Almeida family for US$541 million.

Description 
Currently the company has six highway concessions, 14 logistics units and a port terminal. It is Brazil's second-largest operator of toll roads.

The company's major shareholder is the Brazilian conglomerate CR Almeida And Apoquindo Capital a Chilean fund manager is one of the minority shareholders.   The EcoRodovias main competitors are CCR and Arteris.

References 

Companies listed on B3 (stock exchange)
Companies based in São Paulo
Transport companies of Brazil
Airport operators